Miao is a Unicode block containing characters of the Pollard script, used for writing the Hmong Daw and A-Hmao languages.

History
The following Unicode-related documents record the purpose and process of defining specific characters in the Miao block:

References 

Unicode blocks